The Philippine Chung Hua School (PCHS) is located at 3217 Reposo Street, Santa Mesa, Manila, Philippines. The school teaches Chinese and Filipino, as well as English.

History
The Philippine Chung Hua School was originally located on G. Tuazon Street, near the corner of M. Arenas, in Sampaloc, Manila. During that time, the school was a simple two-story building, occupying about 600 square feet. All classrooms, grade 1 to grade 5 were located on the second floor. The principal's and teachers' offices were located on the ground floor. The Manila Sampaloc Chinese-Filipino Chamber of Commerce was also located on the first floor. Now, it is a school that teaches Kindergarten to Grade 12

Curriculum

Elementary schools in Manila
High schools in Manila
Chinese-language schools in Manila
Education in Santa Mesa
Educational institutions established in 1946
1946 establishments in the Philippines